The One is the fifth studio album by Puerto Rican singer and songwriter Yandel. It was released on March 29, 2019, under Sony Music Latin. It was recorded at Criteria Studios in Miami. It was produce by Yandel and some of the biggest producers like Tainy, Nesty "La Mente Maestra", Luny Tunes among others. It is also his first album as a solo artist to not have any featured artist nor collaborations. He mentioned in an interview that one of the reasons he named it The One is because the album only has his voice with no collaborations.

Singles and favorite songs
Yandel released Sumba Yandel as the first single for this album on January 14, 2019, which was also his 42nd birthday. The song "Calentón", considered the second single as the music video was release on the same day as the album. Perreito Lite and Una Vez Más were released as singles with music videos later on that year.

Billboard published a top 5 favorite tracks list of the album written by Suzette Fernandez. Each song is being described. The songs on that list were "Dime", "Tequila", "Mia Mia", "Que No Acabe", and "Pa Que Goce".

Track listing

Charts

References

2019 albums
Yandel albums
Spanish-language albums
Sony Music Latin albums